Arumana no Kiseki is a platform game by Konami for the Family Computer Disk System. It was released in Japan on August 11, 1987. In 2012, reproduction cartridges of the game were created for the NES under the title of 'Miracle of Almana'.

Synopsis
A magic red jewel, known as the Arumana, is stolen from an unnamed village. A thief runs off with the jewel and turns the entire village into stone. In order to restore the village to its former glory, the game's hero (Kaito) must track down the thief and recover the stolen jewel.

Gameplay

The player takes the role of a hero named Kaito, who bears a resemblance to Indiana Jones, and must travel through six cavernous levels in search of the stolen jewel, Arumana. The player begins with thirty throwing knives as his weapon of attack. As they venture through the levels they can find various other weapons. These include bombs, a handgun, bolas, a crystal ball that destroys everything on screen, and mines. He must destroy various cave dwelling creatures as well as soldiers, who sometimes drop weapons.

Kaito's main source of transportation is unique. Besides just walking and jumping, like most platform games, he must also use a special grappling hook to reach platforms that are too high. To make things a little more difficult, the grappling hook can only be launched from a diagonal direction and not just straight above.

The game itself is very reminiscent to Indiana Jones and the Temple of Doom. The appearance of Kaito is not only nearly identical to the series' adventurer, but the game's cave environments and plot, which revolves around the main character recovering a jewel that grants life to a village, are very similar to his explorations.  The game also borrows heavily from an earlier Konami release, Roc 'N Rope, with the main character firing ropes at platforms to cross wide chasms.

Notes

References

External links
Arumana no Kiseki at Atari HQ

1987 video games
Famicom Disk System games
Japan-exclusive video games
Konami games
Famicom Disk System-only games
Platform games
Single-player video games
Video games scored by Kinuyo Yamashita
Video games developed in Japan